Washington's 18th legislative district is one of forty-nine districts in Washington state for representation in the state legislature.

The district is located within Clark County, bordering the 20th district in the north, the 14th district in the east, and the 49th and 17th districts in the southwest.

The 18th district includes six of the seven incorporated cities in Clark County, including Ridgefield in the west, Battle Ground in the center, Camas and Washougal in the south, Vancouver in the southwest, and La Center and  Yacolt in the north. Additionally, the district represents the residents of unincorporated Clark County localities Salmon Creek, Brush Prairie and Hazel Dell.

This combination rural and suburban district is represented by state representatives Stephanie McClintock (position 1) and Greg Cheney (position 2), as well as state senator Ann Rivers; all are Republicans.

See also
Washington Redistricting Commission
Washington State Legislature
Washington State Senate
Washington House of Representatives

References

External links
Washington State Redistricting Commission
Washington House of Representatives
Map of Legislative Districts

18